The Grave of the Female Stranger is a famous historical oddity as well as a local landmark and visitor's attraction in St. Paul's Cemetery of St Paul's Episcopal Church in Alexandria, Virginia.

The grave is the resting place of an unnamed individual who died in 1816 and was elevated to national intrigue by the mysterious headstone and romanticized tale. Accounts of the stranger increase in oddity over time and help to incite further speculation as to the identity of the person buried in the grave. The reported location of the woman's death, Room 8 at Gadsby's Tavern, is also a tourist destination, and supposedly her ghostly visage can be seen standing at the window.

The story has sparked conjecture that has continued for more than a century. In addition to various articles and reports, there have also been novels including Narrative of John Trust  (1883) by William Francis Carne, author of George Washington's Boyhood.

Inscription
To the memory of a
FEMALE STRANGER
whose mortal sufferings terminated
on the 14th day of October 1816
Aged 23 years and 8 months

This stone is placed here by her disconsolate
Husband in whose arms she sighed out her
latest breath, and who under God
did his utmost even to soothe the cold
dead ear of death

How loved how valued once avails thee not
To whom related or by whom begot
A heap of dust alone remains of thee
Tis all thou art and all the proud shall be

To him gave all the Prophets witness that
through his name whosoever believeth in
him shall receive remission of sins
Acts. 10th Chap. 43rd verse.

The second to last stanza was intended to be taken from Elegy to the Memory of an Unfortunate Lady by Alexander Pope though there are some differences.

Accounts and speculation

Early accounts
In May 1833, a poem regarding a visit to the Grave of the Female Stranger was composed for the Alexandria Gazette, and published almost a year later, in March 1834. This was at first submitted under the initials S.D. and was later found to be the work of poet Susan Rigby Dallam Morgan of Baltimore when her husband Rev. Lyttleton Morgan published his wife's poems posthumously.

The earliest appeal to the national audience was in 1836, when columnist "Lucy Seymour" of Maryland recorded the account in The Philadelphia Saturday Courier. Lucy Seymour was the pen name of Susan Rigby Dallam Morgan.

In Seymour's account, the Stranger had been a young, foreign woman with a tearful face and a pale complexion. The woman also seemed ill and troubled. The Stranger's male companion appeared inauthentic to the locals as her husband. True to form, the man quickly left after the Stranger was buried. The only person that the Stranger confided in was a local pastor.

Seymour's sources are not explicitly named. She implies that she took interest in the cemetery first and then began to ask questions about the interesting gravesite. This pattern of discovery closely mirrors her earlier poem. Furthermore, Seymour speculates that the tombstone inscription was written in a manner "strangely calculated to awaken interest and elicit sympathy."

In September 1848, the Alexandria Gazette published a response to an article about the Female Stranger written in the Baltimore Sun. The Alexandria Gazette writer states that the woman who arrived was indeed a beautiful woman of a pale complexion and further elaborates on her grace and the admiration of those around her. The author adds that the man's surname was "Clermont," and that after his sudden departure, it was revealed that the $1500 in English currency he had used to pay his bills was counterfeit. Lawrence Hill, one of the men to whom the money was owed, purportedly confronted Clermont sometime later at Sing Sing prison.

Lawrence Hill was indeed a businessman living in Alexandria at the time. He sold his house in Alexandria in 1830, and moved to New York. He died of cholera in New York in the spring of 1849.

Later accounts
Since the 1880s there has been speculation that the woman may have been Theodosia Burr Alston, the daughter of Aaron Burr who was lost at sea. However, this idea seems contrived and the dates given for Theodosia and the Stranger are not consistent.

In September 1886, the Hyde Park Herald published Frank George Carpenter's piece about Alexandria, Virginia, including a section about the Female Stranger. This telling includes a doctor sworn to secrecy, two French maids, and a reclusive English husband who would not allow anyone to see his wife's face or attend her funeral. The author touches on how Alexandria was a wealthy trading port at the time, and it would not be odd for foreign diplomats to land there. In addition, perhaps the wife had another jealous lover, or she was a famous American such as Theodosia Burr Alston.

By 1887, Col. Fred D Massey of Alexandria wrote to the Cincinnati Commercial Gazette (which was later published nationally) that while the legend is well spread, it has only helped to further tangle the story and add to the confusion. The author's version of the story was that a noble couple, seemingly English, arrived by ship with a valet. The wife was a voluptuous blonde with large eyes and a small mouth. She became ill in Alexandria while the couple lived at the "leading hotel" at the time.

The husband, valet and doctor were the only ones to see her during the illness. She died in her husband's arms locked in a kiss. Further, only the husband and the valet were present at the burial. The husband left by ship, and was later reported to have been seen in New Orleans. He is rumored to have returned to Alexandria in the dead of night with a crew of seamen and exhumed the body, taking it with him.

The Times-Picayune of New Orleans rather boldly published in January 1893, that the grave was Theodosia Burr Alston's and that her husband, Governor Alston (misspelled as Ashton), was seen visiting the grave approximately seventy years prior to the article.

In the 1890s, the concept of the couple being star-crossed lovers was first introduced. In May 1898, the Washington Evening Star reported that two elderly people visited the grave and told church superintendent Webb that the female stranger was a "connection" of theirs, an English noblewoman who ran away with a British officer for love. They also said that they would visit again with more details, but never returned.

Many subsequent accounts have included all or most of these elements. There is also an addition of two local women, also sworn to secrecy, helping the Stranger during her illness.

Modern retelling
The most modern retelling of the story is recorded perhaps as early as 1913, and is quite elaborate given that it was published nearly one hundred years after the Stranger had died. A large spread, including a dramatic illustration, was featured in the Ladies' Home Journal for January 1913. It tells of the brig Four Sons en route from Halifax, Nova Scotia, to the West Indies diverting her course for the Potomac River and letting off a small lifeboat carrying a man and a woman. A sick woman covered in a black veil was lifted out of the boat and carried to "Bunch-of-Grapes Tavern" (a misnomer for Gadsby's Tavern, due to the image on the establishment's sign). The man, assumed to be the husband, found the best room at the tavern and sent for the doctor. The doctor was sworn to secrecy, and the woman's face remained covered. Two women staying at the hotel were also sworn to secrecy and helped to nurse the sick woman.

The husband alone witnessed the death, prepared the body for burial, and sealed the coffin. He disappeared, but returned every fall to put flowers on the grave. At some point, the grave fell into disrepair and three elderly people appeared at the site. When questioned by the church sexton, they revealed that they were relatives of the woman, and that she had married a British officer.

Another account stipulated that the woman was indeed Theodosia Burr Alston and the supposed husband was a pirate. Another theory suggests that the woman was Sarah Curran, fiancée of Irish Revolutionist Robert Emmet, who may have been forced to marry a British naval officer. However, the unknown author further acknowledges that this is "pure speculation."

See also
 List of unsolved deaths

References

1793 births
1816 deaths
History of Alexandria, Virginia
National Register of Historic Places in Alexandria, Virginia
Tourist attractions in Alexandria, Virginia
Unidentified decedents in the United States
Unsolved deaths in the United States